Guugu Yimithirr, also rendered Guugu Yimidhirr, Guguyimidjir, and many other spellings, is an Australian Aboriginal language, the traditional language of the Guugu Yimithirr people of Far North Queensland. It belongs to the Pama-Nyungan language family. However,  only about half of the Guugu Yimithirr nation speak the language. As such, efforts are being made to teach it to children. Guugu Yimithirr is the source language of the word kangaroo (from  [gaŋuru]).

Name
The word  means 'speech, language', while  (or ) means  -having,  being the word for 'this'. The use of the word , rather than some other word for "this", was seen as a distinctive feature of Guugu Yimithirr. The element  and the practice of naming based on some distinctive word is found in many other languages.

The name has many spelling variants, including Gogo-Yimidjir, Gugu-Yimidhirr, Gugu Yimithirr, Guugu Yimidhirr, Guguyimidjir (used by Ethnologue), Gugu Yimijir, Kukuyimidir, Koko Imudji, Koko Yimidir, Kuku Jimidir, Kuku Yimithirr, and Kuku Yimidhirr.

Geographic distribution

The original territory of the Guugu Yimithirr tribe extended northwards to the mouth of the Jeannie River, where it was bordered by speakers of Guugu Nyiguudji; southwards to the Annan River, where it was bordered by speakers of Guugu Yalandji; to the west, it was bordered by speakers of a language called Guugu Warra (literally 'bad talk') or Lama-Lama. The modern town of Cooktown is located within Guugu Yimithirr territory.

As of the early 21st century, however, most Guugu Yimithirr speakers live at the mission at Hopevale.

Dialects
Guugu Yimithirr originally consisted of several dialects, although even the names of most have now been forgotten. Today, two main dialects are distinguished: the coastal dialect, called  'with the sea', and the inland dialect, called  'of the outside'. Missionaries used the coastal dialect to translate hymns and Bible stories, so some of its words now have religious associations that the inland equivalents lack.  There was once also a Ngegudi or Gugu Nyiguudyi dialect.

History

In 1770, Guugu Yimithirr became the first Australian Aboriginal language to be written down when Lieutenant (later Captain) James Cook and his crew recorded words while their ship, the HM Bark Endeavour, was being repaired after having run aground on a shoal of the Great Barrier Reef. Joseph Banks described the language as "totally different from that of the Islanders; it sounded more like English in its degree of harshness though it could not be  [sic] harsh neither".

Sydney Parkinson, who accompanied Cook, gave a useful word list in his posthumously published journal.

Phonology

Vowels

Consonants

The stops are usually voiceless and unaspirated initially and after short vowels, and voiced after consonants and long vowels.

The rhotic  is normally a flap , but may be a trill in emphatic speech.

Phonotactics
All words, with the exception of a couple of interjections, begin with one consonant. The consonant can be a stop, nasal, or semivowel (that is,  do not occur initially).

Words can end in either a vowel or a consonant.

Within words, any consonant can occur, as well as clusters of up to three consonants, which cannot occur initially or finally.

Grammar
Like many Australian languages, Guugu Yimithirr pronouns have accusative morphology while nouns have ergative morphology. That is, the subject of an intransitive verb has the same form as the subject of a transitive verb if the subject is a pronoun, but the same form as the object of a transitive verb otherwise.

Regardless of whether nouns or pronouns are used, the usual sentence order is subject–object–verb, although other word orders are possible.

The language is notable for its use of pure geographic directions (north, south, east, west) rather than egocentric directions (left, right, forward, backward), though such "purity" is disputed. Still, it has given its speakers a remarkable sense of direction.

Preservation
, only about half of the 1,400 Guugu Yimithirr people speak the language, with mostly only grandparents being fluent speakers. Hope Vale elders are helping to create video tutorials on teaching Guugu Yimithirr, which are being uploaded to YouTube, while the local school, Hope Vale Cape York Aboriginal Australian Academy, has a language program in its curriculum. With the schools closed and learning being done in the home, using the online videos, during the COVID-19 pandemic in Australia, adults as well as younger siblings have been learning the language alongside the schoolchildren.

Vocabulary 
Some words from the Guugu Yimithirr language, as spelt and written by Guugu Yimithirr authors include:
 Balingga: echidna
 Birri: river
 Bubu: land
 Buurraay: water
 Gangurru: kangaroo
 Gulaan: possum
 Guuju: fish
 Jijirr: bird
 Munhu: grass
 Nanggurr: home/camp
 Ngalan: sun
 Thaarba: snake
 Wantharra nyundu? How are you?

References

General references

External links
Guugu Yimithirr exercises (page 2).
Does Your Language Shape How You Think? (NYT)
Bibliography of Guugu Yimidhirr people and language resources, at the Australian Institute of Aboriginal and Torres Strait Islander Studies
Guugu Yimidhirr (Cooktown) community language journey digital story, State Library of Queensland. Part of Spoken: Celebrating Queensland Languages Digital Stories Collection
Guugu Yimidhirr (Hope Vale) community language journey digital story, State Library of Queensland. Part of Spoken: Celebrating Queensland Languages Digital Stories Collection

Yalanjic languages